Chung Myung-hee (Hangul: 정명희; born 27 January 1964) is a former female badminton player from South Korea.

Chung was a nine-time All England Open champion (four-time in women's doubles and five-time in mixed doubles), and won the gold medals at the 1989 and 1991 IBF World Championships in mixed doubles, with Park Joo-bong. She also won a silver medal in the 1989 in women's doubles, with Hwang Hye-young, and a silver and a bronze medal at the 1987 IBF World Championships in mixed doubles and women's doubles respectively.

Chung was inducted to the Badminton Hall of Fame in 2003.

Major achievements

Olympic Games 
Mixed doubles

World Championships 
Mixed doubles

World Cup 
Mixed doubles

Asian Games 
Mixed doubles

Asian Championships 
Mixed doubles

IBF World Grand Prix 
The World Badminton Grand Prix sanctioned by International Badminton Federation (IBF) from 1983 to 2006.

Mixed doubles

References
All England champions 1899-2007

South Korean female badminton players
Asian Games medalists in badminton
1964 births
Living people
Badminton players at the 1986 Asian Games
Badminton players at the 1990 Asian Games
Asian Games gold medalists for South Korea
Asian Games bronze medalists for South Korea
Badminton players at the 1988 Summer Olympics
Medalists at the 1986 Asian Games
Medalists at the 1990 Asian Games